Ruslan Ruslanovich Suanov (born 13 October 1997) is a Russian football player. He plays for PFC Dynamo Stavropol.

Club career
He made his debut in the Russian Football National League for FC Zenit-2 Saint Petersburg on 10 May 2016 in a game against FC Fakel Voronezh.

Personal
His father, also called Ruslan Suanov, also was a professional footballer.

References

External links
 Profile by Russian Football National League

1997 births
Sportspeople from Vladikavkaz
Living people
Russian footballers
Association football forwards
Russia youth international footballers
FC Lada-Tolyatti players
FC Zenit-2 Saint Petersburg players
FC Spartak Vladikavkaz players
FC Rubin Yalta players
FC Dynamo Bryansk players
FC Dynamo Stavropol players
Russian First League players
Russian Second League players